Todd Waring (born April 28, 1955) is an American actor, best known for replacing Tom Hanks in the roles in both the television series version of Nothing in Common, as well as Splash, Too.

Early life
Waring was born in Ballston Spa, New York.

Career 
Waring has played minor roles in various films and television series, including The Stiller and Meara Show, Wings and Star Trek: Deep Space Nine. On NYPD Blue, he portrayed Malcolm Cullinan in a story arc as a rich man who committed murder.

In 2007, he appeared in the short films Wilted, Dr. In Law, Spaghetti, Catch, Oh, Boy., and Keep Off Grass, which were made during the film-making reality series On the Lot. Todd portrayed Todd Scheller, who is John Abbott's ex-cell mate on The Young and the Restless on November 27, 2007.

Filmography

Film

Television

References

External links
 
 
 

1955 births
Living people
American male film actors
American male television actors
People from Ballston Spa, New York
20th-century American male actors
21st-century American male actors
Male actors from New York (state)